The Municipal Courts Building, also known as the Lake View Building, is a skyscraper located at 116 S. Michigan Avenue in Chicago, Illinois. The building was built from 1906 to 1907 to serve as a temporary home for Chicago's Municipal Court. The building was completed later than planned, had less square footage than promised, and charged a higher rent than a competing offer from a warehouse, prompting Mayor Edward Dunne to conduct an ethics investigation into the approval of the building contract. The court only used the building until 1911; after it moved out, Kesner added another five stories to the building.

The building was added to the National Register of Historic Places on August 29, 1985.

References

Chicago school architecture in Illinois
Government buildings completed in 1907
Courthouses on the National Register of Historic Places in Illinois
Courthouses in Illinois 
Skyscraper office buildings in Chicago
National Register of Historic Places in Chicago
Municipal courts
1907 establishments in Illinois